Fruzsina Brávik (born 6 October 1986) was a Hungarian female water polo player. 
She was a member of the Hungary women's national water polo team, playing as a driver. 
She was a part of the  team at the 2008 Summer Olympics. On club level she played for Dove Dunaújváros in Hungary.

See also
 List of world champions in women's water polo
 List of World Aquatics Championships medalists in water polo

References

External links
 

1986 births
Living people
Hungarian female water polo players
Water polo players at the 2008 Summer Olympics
Olympic water polo players of Hungary
People from Dunaújváros
21st-century Hungarian women